Anthony Valentine Patrick Johnson (31 August 1924 – 31 May 2001), was an Australian politician. He was a member of the New South Wales Legislative Assembly between 1973 and 1983.

Parliamentary career 
In 1973 Johnson was elected to the New South Wales Legislative Assembly for the seat of Mount Druitt. In 1981 he was elected to the seat of Riverstone, where he remained until leaving Parliamentary service in 1983.

Johnson died in 2001 at the age of 76. He is buried beside his wife, Cecily 'Cec' Maria Johnson at Pine Grove Memorial Park.

References

2001 deaths
Members of the New South Wales Legislative Assembly
Australian Labor Party members of the Parliament of New South Wales
1924 births